The Traffic Signs Regulations and General Directions (commonly abbreviated to TSRGD) is the law that sets out the design and conditions of use of official traffic signs that can be lawfully placed on or near roads in Great Britain (England, Scotland and Wales) and the Isle of Man. The regulations, originally introduced in 1965, were the result of the review of British road signage carried out by the Worboys Committee.

Versions
The TSRGD was introduced on 1 January 1965 to implement the re-signing recommendations of the Worboys Committee of 1963, with signage designs and typeface developed by Jock Kinneir and Margaret Calvert. Since 1964, TSRGD has been revised and re-issued several times since to introduce new signage rules and features reflecting changes in road operations. The current edition of the regulations came into force on 22 April 2016, with minor amendments in England and Wales in 2017.

Traffic Signs Manual
The Traffic Signs Manual is a companion guide to the TSRGD which sets out dimensions and other details for using the authorised signs and markings.

See also
 Highways Act 1980
 Highway Code
 Road Traffic Regulation Act 1984
 Vienna Convention on Road Signs and Signals
 Manual on Uniform Traffic Control Devices, a comparable system in the United States

References

External links
 The Traffic Signs Regulations and General Directions 2002 (SI 2002/3113) (PDF version)
 The Traffic Signs Regulations and General Directions 2016 (SI 2016/362)
 The Traffic Signs (Amendment) (England and Wales) Regulations and General Directions 2017
 TSRGD Online Web-app (unofficial mirror site)

Traffic law
Statutory Instruments of the United Kingdom
2002 in the Isle of Man
2002 in British law
Roads in the United Kingdom
Transport policy in the United Kingdom
Driving in the United Kingdom
Transportation engineering standards